Young Catherine is a 1991 British TV miniseries based on the early life of Catherine II of Russia. Directed by Michael Anderson, it stars Julia Ormond as Catherine and Vanessa Redgrave as Empress Elizabeth.

Plot summary
In the early 1740s, Elizabeth, Empress of Russia, is seeking a bride for her nephew and heir, Peter. She picks the beautiful Princess Sophie, a teenager from a tiny German-speaking state. It's a huge change of fortune for the naive young girl. After arriving in Russia, she is received into the Russian Orthodox Church under the new name Catherine. Though she feels like an outsider at first, she eventually becomes devoted to her new homeland, its culture and its people.

But her personal life is in turmoil. Peter is mentally unbalanced and sometimes vicious. Shortly after the couple's wedding, he makes clear that the marriage will never be consummated. Meanwhile, Empress Elizabeth, whose anger is legendary, expects Catherine to produce an heir or perhaps suffer the consequences. One of the troubled Catherine's few confidants is an aging, worldly-wise British diplomat, Sir Charles Williams. On his advice, she gives up her virginity to a soldier who is devoted to her, and bears a child, Paul, who is officially Peter's son and heir.

As the life of the old empress draws to an end, Peter increasingly threatens to take "revenge" on Catherine, and on Russia itself, once he occupies the throne. Catherine and her supporters at court realize that action is needed to protect her, and some warn that ultimately, the struggle may come down to her life or Peter's.

Cast
Vanessa Redgrave ... Empress Elizabeth
Christopher Plummer ... Sir Charles Williams
Julia Ormond ... Grand Duchess Catherine
Franco Nero ... Count Mikhail Vorontsov
Marthe Keller ... Princess Johanna
Maximilian Schell ... Frederick the Great
Mark Frankel ... Count Grigory Orlov
Reece Dinsdale ... Grand Duke Peter
Anna Kanakis ... Countess Vorontsova
John Shrapnel ... Archimandrite Todorsky
Hartmut Becker ... Prince Christian August
Alexander Kerst ... Prussian Ambassador
Laurie Holden ...Princess Catherine Dashkova
Katharine Schlesinger ... Elizabeth Vorontsova
Katya Galitzine ... Maria Choglokov
Rory Edwards ... Alexis Orlov

Award and nominations
Primetime Emmy Awards
Primetime Emmy Award for Outstanding Supporting Actress in a Miniseries or a Movie - Vanessa Redgrave (nomination)
Primetime Emmy Award for Outstanding Costumes for a Miniseries, Movie or a Special - Larisa Konnikova (nomination)

Gemini Award
Best Dramatic Mini-Series (won)
Best Costume Design - Larisa Konnikova (nomination)
Best Performance by an Actress in a Leading Role in a Dramatic Program or Mini-Series - Julia Ormond (nomination)
Best Photography in a Dramatic Program or Series - Ernest Day (nomination)
Best Production Design or Art Direction - Harold Thrasher, Natalya Vasilyeva (nomination)

Versions
Both a 150-minute version and a 180-minute Turner Network Television version were released on VHS on May 29, 1991, and both are currently out of print. A 187-minute Russian language version was at one time available on DVD.
The film became available on DVD from the Warner Bros Archive Collection on November 19, 2013.

References

External links

Clips from Young Catherine:  - 

1991 television films
1991 films
1991 British television series debuts
1991 British television series endings
British television films
Fiction set in 1744
1990s British drama television series
1990s British television miniseries
Gemini and Canadian Screen Award for Best Television Film or Miniseries winners
Depictions of Catherine the Great on television
Television series set in the 18th century
Cultural depictions of Peter III of Russia
1990s English-language films